Lisa Margaret O'Malley (born 25 September 1968) is an Australian politician. She has been a Labor member of the Western Australian Legislative Assembly since the 2017 state election, representing Bicton.

O'Malley was born in Victoria and moved to Western Australia in 1993. She worked as a personal trainer and group fitness leader, and managed two gymnasiums from 1993 to 2000. She was elected to Melville City Council in 2015.

References

1968 births
Living people
Australian Labor Party members of the Parliament of Western Australia
Members of the Western Australian Legislative Assembly
Western Australian local councillors
Women members of the Western Australian Legislative Assembly
Women local councillors in Australia
21st-century Australian politicians
21st-century Australian women politicians